The 1989 Vuelta a España was the 44th edition of the Vuelta a España, one of cycling's Grand Tours. The Vuelta began in A Coruña, with a stage on 24 April 1989, and Stage 12 from Lleida occurred on 5 May 1989. The race finished in Madrid on 15 May 1989.

Stage 12
5 May 1989 — Lleida to Cerler,

Stage 13
6 May 1989 — Benasque to Jaca,

Stage 14
7 May 1989 — Jaca to Zaragoza,

Stage 15
8 May 1989 — Ezcaray to Valdezcaray,  (ITT)

Stage 16
9 May 1989 — Haro to Santoña,

Stage 17
10 May 1989 — Santoña to Lakes of Enol,

Stage 18

Stage 19
12 May 1989 — León to Valladolid,

Stage 20
13 May 1989 — Valladolid to Medina del Campo (Destilerías DYC),  (ITT)

Stage 21
14 May 1989 — Collado Villalba to Palazuelos de Eresma (Destillerias DYC),

Stage 22
15 May 1989 — Palazuelos de Eresma (Destillerias DYC) to Madrid,

References

12
1989,12